Passant may refer to:

 Passant, an attitude in heraldry
 The en passant capture, a move in chess
George Passant, a 1940 novel by Charles Percy Snow
Passant Shawky (born 1993), Egyptian actress

See also
 En passant (disambiguation)